Gauz is the author name of Patrick Armand-Gbaka Brede. He was born in 1971 in Abidjan, Ivory Coast.

Biography
Gauz is a photographer, writer, editor of a satirical Ivorian economic newspaper, and the author of the novel Debout-Payé, published in 2014, Paris, by "Le Nouvel Attila". The book is the first recipient of a new award: "le prix des libraires" Gibert Joseph.

His Work
 Debout-Payé, Paris, Le Nouvel Attila, 2014. 173 p. Translated by Frank Wynne as “Standing Heavy” (MacLehose Press, 2022). Longlisted for the 2023 International Booker Prize
 Screenwriter of the movie "Après l'Océan", Le Nouvel Attila
 Camarade Papa, Paris, Le Nouvel Attila, 2020, 264 p.
 Black Manoo, Paris, Le Nouvel Attila, 2020.

Awards
 2014 Prix des libraires Gibert Joseph for Debout-Payé
 Best first French novel of  2014 by the annual ranking Meilleurs livres de l'année du magazine Lire for Debout-Payé

References
 https://web.archive.org/web/20141019215659/http://www.franceculture.fr/evenement-rencontre-avec-gauz-lauteur-de-debout-paye
 http://www.liberation.fr/livres/2014/09/17/gauz-veni-vidi-vigile_1102604
 http://www.lefigaro.fr/livres/2014/09/17/03005-20140917ARTFIG00141-les-invisibles-prennent-la-plume.php
 http://www.lemonde.fr/livres/article/2014/09/04/solidarite-vigile_4481651_3260.html
 http://www.lexpress.fr/culture/livre/le-palmares-des-20-meilleurs-livres-de-l-annee-selon-la-redaction-de-lire_1626307.html
 http://www.livreshebdo.fr/article/gibert-joseph-attribue-son-premier-prix-gauz

External links
 Article by Gauz on the website yeyemagazine
 His websiteLe Nouvel Attila

Living people
1971 births
Ivorian photographers
People from Abidjan